Artur Alves da Silva Neto known as Artur Neto (born 17 January 1955, in Rio de Janeiro) is a Brazilian professional football manager.

Honours 
CRB
 Campeonato Alagoano: 1993

ABC
 Campeonato Potiguar: 1998

Ceará
 Campeonato Cearense: 1998, 2002

Joinville
 Campeonato Catarinense: 2000, 2001
 Copa Santa Catarina: 2012

Atlético Goianiense
 Campeonato Goiano: 2007

References

External links
 
 Profile at Soccerpunter.com
 

1955 births
Living people
Sportspeople from Rio de Janeiro (city)
Brazilian football managers
Campeonato Brasileiro Série A managers
Campeonato Brasileiro Série B managers
Mogi Mirim Esporte Clube managers
Pouso Alegre Futebol Clube managers
Associação Atlética Anapolina managers
Esporte Clube XV de Novembro (Jaú) managers
Ituano FC managers
Clube de Regatas Brasil managers
Criciúma Esporte Clube managers
Grêmio Esportivo Sãocarlense managers
Sampaio Corrêa Futebol Clube managers
ABC Futebol Clube managers
Ceará Sporting Club managers
Clube Náutico Capibaribe managers
Joinville Esporte Clube managers
Club Athletico Paranaense managers
Botafogo Futebol Clube (SP) managers
Figueirense FC managers
Esporte Clube Juventude managers
Paysandu Sport Club managers
América Futebol Clube (RN) managers
Clube do Remo managers
Atlético Clube Goianiense managers
Vila Nova Futebol Clube managers
Itumbiara Esporte Clube managers
Goiás Esporte Clube managers
Esporte Clube Rio Verde managers
Goiânia Esporte Clube managers